Hunua is a small settlement in the rural outskirts of south Auckland, New Zealand.

The literal translation of the Māori language word is 'mountainous and sterile land'.

Demographics

Hunua had a population of 1,353 at the 2018 New Zealand census, an increase of 198 people (17.1%) since the 2013 census, and an increase of 246 people (22.2%) since the 2006 census. There were 444 households, comprising 669 males and 684 females, giving a sex ratio of 0.98 males per female. The median age was 42.6 years (compared with 37.4 years nationally), with 273 people (20.2%) aged under 15 years, 216 (16.0%) aged 15 to 29, 708 (52.3%) aged 30 to 64, and 156 (11.5%) aged 65 or older.

Ethnicities were 94.2% European/Pākehā, 10.2% Māori, 2.2% Pacific peoples, 2.4% Asian, and 1.6% other ethnicities. People may identify with more than one ethnicity.

The percentage of people born overseas was 20.0, compared with 27.1% nationally.

Although some people chose not to answer the census's question about religious affiliation, 58.1% had no religion, 32.2% were Christian, 0.2% had Māori religious beliefs, 0.4% were Hindu, 0.2% were Muslim and 1.6% had other religions.

Of those at least 15 years old, 234 (21.7%) people had a bachelor's or higher degree, and 135 (12.5%) people had no formal qualifications. The median income was $45,800, compared with $31,800 nationally. 324 people (30.0%) earned over $70,000 compared to 17.2% nationally. The employment status of those at least 15 was that 663 (61.4%) people were employed full-time, 177 (16.4%) were part-time, and 24 (2.2%) were unemployed.

Education

References

External links
Photographs of Hunua held in Auckland Libraries' heritage collections.

Populated places in the Auckland Region